In telecommunication and information theory, the code rate (or information rate) of a forward error correction code is the proportion of the data-stream that is useful (non-redundant).

The code rate of the octet oriented Reed Solomon block code denoted RS(204,188) is 188/204, meaning that  redundant octets (or bytes) are added to each block of 188 octets of useful information. 

A few error correction codes do not have a fixed code rate—rateless erasure codes.

Note that bit/s is a more widespread unit of measurement for the information rate, implying that it is synonymous with net bit rate or useful bit rate exclusive of error-correction codes.

See also
 Information rate
 Entropy rate
 Punctured code

References

Information theory
Rates